Structural acoustics is the study of the mechanical waves in structures and how they interact with and radiate into adjacent media.  The field of structural acoustics is often referred to as vibroacoustics in Europe and Asia.  People that work in the field of structural acoustics are known as structural acousticians.  The field of structural acoustics can be closely related to a number of other fields of acoustics including noise, transduction, underwater acoustics, and physical acoustics.

Vibrations in structures

Compressional and shear waves (isotropic, homogeneous material)
Compressional waves (often referred to as longitudinal waves) expand and contract in the same direction (or opposite) as the wave motion. The wave equation dictates the motion of the wave in the x direction.

This has the same form as the acoustic wave equation in one-dimension.   is determined by properties (bulk modulus  and density ) of the structure according to

Shear waves occur due to the shear stiffness and follows a similar equation, but with the displacement occurring in the transverse direction, perpendicular to the wave motion.

Bending waves in beams and plates

Most sound radiation is caused by bending (or flexural) waves, that deform the structure transversely as they propagate.  Bending waves are more complicated than compressional or shear waves and depend on material properties as well as geometric properties.  They are also dispersive since different frequencies travel at different speeds.

Modeling vibrations
Finite element analysis can be used to predict the vibration of complex structures.  A finite element computer program will assemble the mass, stiffness, and damping matrices based on the element geometries and material properties, and solve for the vibration response based on the loads applied.

Sound-structure interaction

Fluid-structure Interaction

When a vibrating structure is in contact with a fluid, the normal particle velocities at the interface must be conserved (i.e. be equivalent).  This causes some of the energy from the structure to escape into the fluid, some of which radiates away as sound, some of which stays near the structure and does not radiate away. For most engineering applications, the numerical simulation of fluid-structure interactions involved in vibro-acoustics may be achieved by coupling the Finite element method and the Boundary element method.

See also 

Acoustics
Acoustic wave equation
Lamb wave
Linear elasticity
Noise control
Sound
Surface acoustic wave
Wave
Wave equation

References

External links
 asa.aip.org —Website of the Acoustical Society of America

Acoustics
Sound